Mungo David Malcolm Murray, 7th Earl of Mansfield and Mansfield (9 August 1900 – 2 September 1971), styled Lord Scone from 1906 to 1935, was a Scottish Unionist Party politician.

Mansfield was the son of Alan Murray, 6th Earl of Mansfield and Mansfield, and his wife Margaret Mary Helen, daughter of Rear-Admiral Sir Malcolm MacGregor, 4th Baronet. He was active in the extreme anti-Catholic Scottish Protestant League before breaking with them following the 1929 United Kingdom general election. This came about when the SPL leader Alexander Ratcliffe offered to support the Unionist candidate for Stirling and Falkirk if he supported the partial repeal of the Education (Scotland) Act 1918 which allowed Catholic schools into the state system funded through education rates. When this didn't happen Ratcliffe stood as an 'Independent Protestant', coming in third behind the Unionist and Labour Party candidates. 

Scone entered Parliament for Perth in 1931, a seat he held until 1935, when he succeeded his father and entered the House of Lords. He was also Governor of the Edinburgh and East of Scotland College of Agriculture from 1925 to 1930, Lord High Commissioner to the General Assembly of the Church of Scotland from 1961 to 1962 and Lord-Lieutenant of Perthshire from 1960 to 1971.

Lord Mansfield and Mansfield married Dorothea Helena, younger daughter of the British diplomat Sir Lancelot Carnegie, in 1928. He died in September 1971, aged 71, and was succeeded in his titles by his only son William, who also became a Conservative politician. His daughter Malvina married Douglas Stuart, 20th Earl of Moray. The Countess of Mansfield and Mansfield died in 1985.

In 1933 he was one of eleven people, involved in the appeal that led to the foundation of the British Trust for Ornithology (BTO), an organisation for the study of birds in the British Isles, of which he became the founding chairman.

Notes

References
Kidd, Charles, Williamson, David (editors). Debrett's Peerage and Baronetage (1990 edition). New York: St Martin's Press, 1990,

External links

1900 births
1971 deaths
Clan Murray
7
Lord-Lieutenants of Perthshire
Murray, Mungo
Murray, Mungo
Mansfield, E7
Earls in the Jacobite peerage